Adenium oleifolium is a species of flowering plant in the family Apocynaceae.

Distribution
This species is native to desert scrubland in the Southern Africa, Angola, and Namibia.

References

oleifolium
Caudiciform plants